David Marks (born 1948) is an American musician and songwriter, member of the Beach Boys.

David Marks may also refer to:
 David Marks (architect) (1952–2017), British architect
 David Marks (songwriter) (born 1944), South African-born songwriter, singer and producer
 David Marks (psychologist) (born 1945), British psychologist
 David J. Marks, woodworker who hosts a TV show on DIY Network
 David Woolf Marks (1811–1909), English Reform Jewish minister
 David Marks (preacher) (1805–1845), early evangelist in the Free Will Baptist Church
 David H. Marks, American engineer
 David Marks, main character in the film All Good Things

See also
David Mark (disambiguation)